The 2021–22 Zamalek SC season was the club's 111th season in existence and the 63rd consecutive season in the top flight of Egyptian football. In addition to the domestic league, Zamalek participated in this season's editions of the Egypt Cup, the EFA Cup and the CAF Champions League.

Players

First-team squad

Out on loan

Transfers

Pre-season and friendlies

Competitions

Overall record

Egyptian Premier League

League table

Results summary

Results by round

Matches
The league fixtures were announced on 12 October 2021.

Egypt Cup

EFA Cup

CAF Champions League

Qualifying rounds 

The draw for the qualifying rounds was held on 13 August 2021.

First round

Group stage

References

Zamalek SC seasons
Zamalek